Kohneh Deh may refer to:
 Kohneh Deh, Alborz
 Kohneh Deh, Nowshahr, Mazandaran Province
 Kohneh Deh, Sari, Mazandaran Province
 Kohneh Deh, West Azerbaijan
 Kohneh Deh, Akhtachi-ye Gharbi, West Azerbaijan Province